The Ducati Diana, known as the Ducati Daytona in the UK, is a  single cylinder bevel drive SOHC motorcycle produced by the Italian manufacturer Ducati from 1961 to 1964. It was the sports version of Ducati's first 250 cc road bike. It was replaced in 1962 by the higher performance Ducati Diana Mark 3 in the US and by the Ducati Mach 1 in Europe in September 1964.

History
Following the success in racing of the 250 F3, and using an engine based on that of the racer, Ducati introduced its first 250 cc road bikes at the April 1961 Milan Fair. The bikes were offered in two versions, the touring Monza and sports Diana. The Diana was styled by Renzo Neri and had rear-set controls, clip-on handlebars, a steel  petrol tank and sporting mudguards. The bike had a blue frame and was finished in blue and silver.

A tuning kit was available for the Diana and included a high compression 9:1 piston, a 27mm Dell'Orto SS1 carburettor and megaphone silencer.

Technical details

Engine and transmission
The single cylinder bevel drive OHC engine was of unit construction and had alloy head and alloy barrels with cast iron liners. Ball bearings were used in the main bearings and big end and hairspring valve springs were used to close the valves. Compression ratio was 8:1.

Fuel was delivered by a 24 mm Dell'Orto UFB carburettor. Wet sump lubrication was used and ignition was by battery and coil with the points under a cover on the right hand side of the engine.

Primary drive was by helical gears to a multi-plate wet clutch and 4 speed gearbox. Chain drive took power to the rear wheel.

Cycle parts
The single cradle frame used the engine as a stressed member. Rear suspension was by swinging arm with twin 3-way adjustable Marzocchi shock absorbers. At the front  telescopic forks were fitted. Brakes were drums, the front being  diameter and the rear .

References

Bibliography
 
 
 
 
 
 
 

Diana
Sport bikes
Motorcycles introduced in 1961
Single-cylinder motorcycles